Abigail Michal Spears (born July 12, 1981) is a former professional tennis player from the United States.

She was suspended for doping offences from 7 November 2019 until 7 September 2021.

Biography

2000–2011
Spears turned professional in 2000. She reached the third round at the 2005 Australian Open, and the first round at the 2005 French Open, 2005 Wimbledon tournament (where she also reached the third round in the doubles tournament with Lisa McShea) and the 2005 US Open.. She reached the third round at the 2008 Wimbledon doubles tournament with Raquel Kops-Jones, and the duo bettered that result by reaching the quarterfinals at the 2008 US Open.

Spears also qualified in singles for the US Open twice. She achieved a singles ranking of world No. 66 on June 6, 2005. Her highest doubles ranking was world No. 11 on June 24, 2013. Spears has not won a WTA singles title, but as of the end of December 2018, she has won 21 WTA doubles titles. She participated in the US Open doubles draw eleven times between 1998 and 2010.

2012
Spears and compatriot Raquel Kops-Jones were one of the most successful doubles team of the 2012 season, winning four titles at Carlsbad, Seoul, Tokyo and Osaka. The pair also reached two other finals and also the quarterfinals of Wimbledon.

2017: Grand Slam breakthrough
2017 was expected to be Spears' farewell year on tour. At the Australian Open, she partnered with Juan Sebastián Cabal to win the mixed-doubles tournament. In the final, they defeated the second seeded team of Sania Mirza and Ivan Dodig 6–2, 6–4. The American-Colombian duo recovered from a 1–4 deficit in the second set to reel off five straight games to clinch the title. It was a revenge match for Spears, having lost to Mirza the last time Spears made it to a Grand Slam final, losing 9–11 in the super tiebreak to Mirza and Bruno Soares at the 2014 US Open. Spears has continued to play on tour and has not retired.

Significant finals

Grand Slam finals

Mixed Doubles: 3 (1 title, 2 runner-ups)

Premier Mandatory/Premier 5 finals

Doubles: 3 (2 titles, 1 runner-up)

WTA career finals

Singles: 1 (1 runner-up)

Doubles: 31 (21 titles, 10 runner-ups)

Grand Slam performance timelines

Singles

Doubles

References

External links
 
 

American female tennis players
Tennis players from San Diego
1981 births
Living people
Australian Open (tennis) champions
Grand Slam (tennis) champions in mixed doubles
Doping cases in tennis
21st-century American women